The Conflict Group is an atoll in Papua New Guinea. The group was sighted in 1879 by HMS Cormorant, by moonlight; it was named in 1880 by Bower, captain of HMS Conflict.
Irai Island is the center of population of the group. 

The small Panasesa Island has an eco resort with a small staff.

In September 2022 the Papua New Guinea government ordered an investigation into the islands' ownership after their owner, Australian businessman Ian Gowrie Smith, attempted to sell them.

Islands in Conflict Group 
The individual islands in a clockwise direction, starting in the west (Kisa and Itamarina in the lagoon):

Differing surface areas, and sometimes divergent names for individual islands can be found in Oceandots: Irai (97 ha), Panasesa (63.5 ha), Auriora (61 ha), Panarakum (38.8 ha), Panibari (24.7 ha), Tubiniguam (17.8 ha), Moniara (13 ha), Ginouri (11 ha) and Tupit (10 ha).  Thereafter, the total land area of the archipelago is 3.75 km².

References 

Archipelagoes of Papua New Guinea
Atolls of Papua New Guinea
Islands of Milne Bay Province
Louisiade Archipelago